Mark Kanemura is an American dancer noted for appearances on seasons 4 and 7 of So You Think You Can Dance, music video and concert performances, and his Instagram posts.

Career 
Kanemura is from Honolulu. His mother, Nora, was born in American Samoa. He was a finalist (top 6) on season 4 of So You Think You Can Dance. After, he danced in music videos including "Truly in Love" by Lil Mama. Kanemura is a frequent collaborator with Lady Gaga and danced on The Monster Ball Tour and music videos including "Telephone," "Alejandro," "Born This Way," and "Judas." He was featured in the music video for "Make Me" by Janet Jackson. Kanemura performed with Katy Perry and danced in Britney/Brittany. He was on season 7 of So You Think You Can Dance. Kanemura was featured in an episode of Nailed by YouTuber Michael Henry. He's appeared on RuPaul's Drag Race as a dancer and choreographer. In 2018, he danced in several music videos of Carly Rae Jepsen. He has generated a following on Instagram, with several of his posts going viral.

He is known for his quick-changes of wigs.

Awards and nominations

References

External links
 

Dancers from Hawaii
People from Honolulu
LGBT dancers
Gay entertainers
So You Think You Can Dance (American TV series) contestants
American Internet celebrities
LGBT people from Hawaii
American LGBT entertainers
American people of Samoan descent
Living people
1983 births